The Kohlberg (From , "Coal Mountain"), Coal Hill or Spring Hill is a low mountain in Northampton County, Pennsylvania. A small portion of the mountain reaches into Springfield Township, Bucks County. 

It is a part of the Reading Prong of the Appalachian Mountains.

References 

Mountains of Northampton County, Pennsylvania
Mountains of Pennsylvania